Daniel Joseph Carden (born 28 October 1986) is a British Labour Party politician serving as the Member of Parliament (MP) for Liverpool Walton since 2017. Carden served as Shadow Secretary of State for International Development from 2018 to 2020, and Shadow Financial Secretary to the Treasury from April to October 2020. He was reelected in 2019.

Early life and career
Carden has described himself as a "proud Scouser", having been born and raised in Liverpool. His mother worked in the NHS for over 40 years. His father, Mike Carden, was a shop steward during the Liverpool dockers' dispute during the 1990s, and was left unemployed for seven years after being sacked for refusing to cross a picket line. In his maiden speech, Carden recalled: “From the age of eight, I stood on picket lines, and I’m as proud to stand alongside workers in struggle today as an MP as I was then as a kid”.

His secondary education was at St Edward's College in West Derby (OE 1998–2005) where he was the Head Boy. He went on to study BSc International Relations at the London School of Economics, where he was also Chair of the University Labour Club.

Prior to becoming an MP, Carden worked at Unite the Union in the office of its General Secretary, Len McCluskey.

Parliamentary career
In 2017, Carden defeated Liverpool City Mayor Joe Anderson, Theresa Griffin MEP and others to be selected by the NEC to become Labour's candidate for Liverpool Walton, after the previous MP Steve Rotheram stood down to become Liverpool City Region Metro Mayor. On 8 June, he was elected MP with 85.7% of the vote with a 32,551 majority – the strongest result in opposed elections in the seat's history.

Carden is a patron of LGBT Labour, one of eight LGBT MPs newly elected in the 2017 general election. An avowed socialist, he paid tribute to his  predecessor Eric Heffer in a memorial lecture in January 2019. He is a member of the Socialist Campaign Group.

In 2017, Carden campaigned for a ban on LGBT conversion therapy after a church in Anfield was exposed by a Liverpool Echo investigation for offering ritual starvation as a 'cure' for homosexuality. In July 2018, the UK Government pledged to bring forward proposals for a legislative ban.

In July 2018, Carden used two consecutive Prime Minister's Questions to call for the new Royal Liverpool Hospital to be delivered in the public sector following the collapse of Carillion. On 25 September 2018, it was reported that the government would terminate the Private finance initiative deal, taking the hospital into full public ownership.

In the run-up to the 2019 General Election, a BuzzFeed journalist alleged that Carden had replaced the lyrics to the chorus of The Beatles' "Hey Jude" with "Hey Jews" during a coach trip with other Labour MPs and journalists from Cheltenham races 20 months earlier. Labour MP Mark Tami disputed the allegations. Carden denied the allegations, stating: "This was a coach full of journalists and MPs. If anyone genuinely believed any anti-semitic behaviour had taken place, they would've had a moral responsibility to report it immediately. Yet this allegation is only made now when a General Election is imminent."

Carden successfully defended his Liverpool Walton seat in the 2019 general election, winning 34,538 votes. This represented 84.7% of the vote, and, at 74.83%, the largest majority in the entire country.

In November 2021, Carden, who has previously spoken out about his struggle with alcohol addiction, tabled an amendment to the Health and Social Care Bill which would introduce minimum unit pricing.

In March 2022, Carden delivered an address to the global assembly of parliamentarians in Indonesia. Referencing his Irish heritage, he called on countries to accept more refugees and to reject "anti-migrant, racist rhetoric".

Shadow International Development Secretary
On 1 December 2018, he was appointed Shadow Secretary of State for International Development after the resignation of Kate Osamor following events surrounding her son's drugs conviction.

In the run-up to the 2019 General Election, Carden promised “the most radical international development policies ever seen in this country.” He said Labour would turn the CDC Group into a green development bank and create a new Public Services Unit for water, healthcare and education. Other policy plans included banning all aid spending on fossil fuels, support for trade unions globally, tripling funding for women's rights groups, introducing an ombudsman for abuse in aid sector and support for small-scale farmers with a Food Sovereignty Fund.

Carden called for the UK to use its influence to democratise the IMF and World Bank, challenging the agenda of liberalising markets, cutting social spending and privatising public services “so the poorest countries can decide their own destiny”. Alongside Shadow Chancellor John McDonnell, he proposed an Overseas Loan Transparency Act to establish a new compulsory register to put an end to exploitative secret loans to foreign governments. At the time of the COVID-19 pandemic, Carden called for the debts of countries in the Global South to be cancelled so that resources could go towards healthcare not debt repayments.

Shadow Financial Secretary to the Treasury
On 9 April 2020, Carden became Shadow Financial Secretary to the Treasury following a reshuffle by new party leader Keir Starmer. In October, he accused the Conservative government of corruption in its handling of the COVID-19 pandemic, highlighting public contracts handed to Tory-linked firms without competition or transparency.

On 15 October, Carden resigned from Labour's front bench in order to vote against the Covert Human Intelligence Sources (Criminal Conduct) Bill, defying the party's instruction to abstain. In his resignation letter, he wrote: "As a Liverpool MP and trade unionist, I share the deep concerns about this legislation from across the labour movement, human rights organisations, and so many who have suffered the abuse of state power, from blacklisted workers to the Hillsborough families and survivors."

Personal life
Carden is gay. He is a supporter of Liverpool F.C. and an advocate of football fan activism, including Liverpool and Everton supporters' initiative Fans Supporting Foodbanks.

References

External links

1986 births
Living people
People from West Derby
Politicians from Liverpool
Alumni of the London School of Economics
People educated at St Edward's College
UK MPs 2017–2019
UK MPs 2019–present
Labour Party (UK) MPs for English constituencies
Gay politicians
English LGBT politicians
LGBT members of the Parliament of the United Kingdom
English socialists
21st-century LGBT people
English people of Irish descent